MTPA may refer to:

 Mauritius Tourism Promotion Authority, board to promote Mauritius tourism industry
 Mosher's acid, a carboxylic acid
 Million Tonnes Per Annum, a weight based production measurement value
 Metric Tonnes Per Annum, a weight based production measurement value
 HADHA, enzyme
 Maximum torque per ampere, a motor control algorithm